Wing Sing Street, commonly known as Egg Street, was a street in Sheung Wan, Hong Kong.   The narrow street was well known for its egg market, dating back to early Chinese settlement of Victoria City on Hong Kong Island. The market was erased from the map by Land Development Corporation for the re-development of the area bounded by Wing Lok Street, Man Wa Lane, Bonham Strand, Queen's Road Central and Wing Wo Street.  The bounded area now contains the Cosco Tower and Grand Millennium Plaza.

See also
 List of streets and roads in Hong Kong

Sheung Wan
Street markets in Hong Kong
Roads on Hong Kong Island